The pale-tipped inezia or pale-tipped tyrannulet (Inezia caudata) is a species of bird in the family Tyrannidae. It is found in Brazil, Colombia, French Guiana, Guyana, Suriname, and Venezuela. Its natural habitats are subtropical or tropical dry forests, subtropical or tropical moist lowland forests, subtropical or tropical mangrove forests, and heavily degraded former forest.

References

pale-tipped inezia
Birds of Colombia
Birds of Venezuela
Birds of the Guianas
pale-tipped inezia
pale-tipped inezia
Taxonomy articles created by Polbot